Březina is a municipality and village in Svitavy District in the Pardubice Region of the Czech Republic. It has about 300 inhabitants.

Administrative parts
The village of Šnekov is an administrative part of Březina.

References

Villages in Svitavy District